Bart Howard (born Howard Joseph Gustafson, June 1, 1915 – February 21, 2004) was an American composer and songwriter, most notably of the jazz standard "Fly Me to the Moon", which has been  performed by Kaye Ballard, Judy Garland, Frank Sinatra, Tony Bennett, Ella Fitzgerald, Nancy Wilson, Della Reese, Bobby Womack, Diana Krall, Paul Anka, June Christy, Brenda Lee, Astrud Gilberto, Nat King Cole, Peggy Lee, and Sia, among others. It is played frequently by jazz and popular musicians around the world. Howard wrote the song for his partner of 58 years, Thomas Fowler.

Biography
Howard was born in Burlington, Iowa. He began his career as an accompanist at the age of 16 and played for Mabel Mercer, Johnny Mathis and Eartha Kitt, among others.

"Fly Me to the Moon" was first sung in 1954 by Felicia Sanders at the Blue Angel nightclub in Manhattan, where the composer became M.C. and accompanist in 1951. The song received wide exposure when Peggy Lee sang it on The Ed Sullivan Show several years later. Bart Howard "lived off" this song for the rest of his life, although he had 49 other songs to his credit.  These include "Let Me Love You", "On the First Warm Day", "One Love Affair", "Be My All", "The Man in the Looking Glass", "My Love Is a Wanderer", "Who Wants to Fall in Love" and "Don't Dream of Anybody But Me". 
 
Howard died February 21, 2004, at age 88, in Carmel, New York. He was survived by a sister Dorothy Lind of Burlington, Iowa and by his partner of 58 years, Thomas Fowler.

Notes
The original title was "In Other Words", but so many people referred to it by the first lyric line, ("fly me to the moon") the publisher changed the title to "Fly Me to the Moon".

References

 Todd S. Jenkins (2004), Free Jazz and Free Improvisation: An Encyclopedia,  Greenwood Press

External links

 

1915 births
2004 deaths
20th-century American composers
20th-century American male musicians
20th-century American pianists
20th-century jazz composers
20th-century LGBT people
21st-century American composers
21st-century American male musicians
21st-century American pianists
21st-century jazz composers
21st-century LGBT people
Accompanists
American jazz composers
American male jazz composers
American male pianists
Jazz musicians from New York (state)
LGBT jazz composers
People from Burlington, Iowa
People from Carmel, New York